Marginellonidae are a taxonomic family of deep water marine gastropod molluscs in the clade Neogastropoda.

Genera 
Afrivoluta Tomlin, 1947
Marginellona Martens, 1904
Tateshia Kosuge, 1947

References

 
Volutoidea